The Pieper M1893 was a double action revolver carbine with a gas seal system that used the 8mm Pieper Carbine cartridge.

Design and development 
The development of the weapon began in 1893 by the Belgian gunsmith Henri Pieper and from 1896 it began to supply the Mexican government for use by the Rural Police. The weapon uses a gas seal system similar to that of the Nagant Revolver, in which The cylinder is raised forward on a semi-conical base at the rear of the barrel, allowing a forward movement of the cylinder when firing and as the bullet is inside the case of the cartridge, it is possible to create a seal that prevents the escape of gases and therefore improves shooting performance.

The first prototypes were designed to use the 7.65 mm Mauser cartridge, however the production copies used the 8mm Pieper Carbine, it had a wooden stock and forend, a double-action system that can be manually cocked and a 9-round cylinder that can be balanced towards the rear. right side for recharging. The barrel has a 4-line rifling and the rear sight features a stepped base and a slider adjustable up to 900 meters.

The 8mm Pieper Carbine cartridge was designed in 1895 for the M1893, the 125-grain bullet was fully submerged in case neck and was produced by both the F.N. as by Remington United Metallic Cartridge Company.

References 

8 mm firearms
Rifles of Mexico
Rifles of Belgium